Wordplay is a literary technique in which the nature of the words used themselves become part of the subject of the work.

Wordplay may also refer to:

Film and television
 Wordplay (film), a 2006 documentary film about crossword puzzles
 Wordplay (game show), a game show that ran on NBC from 1986 to 1987
 Wordplay (British game show), a game show that began to air in 2009 on UK channel Five
 "Wordplay" (The Twilight Zone), an episode of the television series The New Twilight Zone
 Wordplay (website), a website run by screenwriters Ted Elliott and Terry Rossio

Music
 Wordplay (musician), a British musician
 Wordplay (album), a music album by the Christian parody band Apologetix 
 "Wordplay" (song), a song from the album Mr. A-Z, written by Jason Mraz